Brunswick County Schools is a PK–12 graded school district serving Brunswick County, North Carolina. Its 19 schools serve 12,603 students as of the 2017–2018 school year.

Student demographics
For the 2017–2018 school year, Brunswick County Schools had a total population of 12,603 students and 825.11 teachers on a (FTE) basis. This produced a student-teacher ratio of 15.27:1. For the 2011-2012 school year, out of the student total, the gender ratio was 51% male to 49% female. The demographic group makeup was: White, 68%; Black, 17%; Hispanic, 10%; American Indian, 1%; and Asian/Pacific Islander, 1% (two or more races: 4%). For the same school year, 61.80% of the students received free and reduced-cost lunches.

Governance
The primary governing body of Brunswick County Schools follows a council–manager government format with a five-member Board of Education appointing a Superintendent to run the day-to-day operations of the system. The school system currently resides in the North Carolina State Board of Education's Second District.

Board of Education
The five members of the Board of Education generally meet on the first Tuesday of each month. The current members of the board are: Catherine D. Cooke (Chair), Ellen G. Milligan (Vice-Chair), Charles W. Miller, Harry E. Lemon Jr., and Gerald D. Benton Jr.

Superintendent
The current superintendent of Brunswick County Schools is Dr. Jerry Oates.

Member schools
Brunswick County Schools has 19 schools ranging from pre-kindergarten to twelfth grade. Those 19 schools are separated into four high schools, four middle schools, nine elementary schools, one Career/Technical center, and one combined middle/elementary school.

High schools

Brunswick County Early College High School (Bolivia)
North Brunswick High School (Leland)
South Brunswick High School (Southport)
The COAST (Center of Applied Sciences and Technology) – grades 6–12 (Bolivia)
West Brunswick High School (Shallotte)

Middle schools
 Cedar Grove Middle School (Supply)
 Leland Middle School (Leland)
 Shallotte Middle School (Shallotte)
 South Brunswick Middle School (Southport)
 Waccamaw School – grades K–8 (Ash)

Elementary schools
 Belville Elementary School (Leland)
 Bolivia Elementary School (Bolivia)
 Jessie Mae Monroe Elementary School (Ash)
 Lincoln Elementary School (Leland)
 Southport Elementary School (Southport)
 Supply Elementary School (Supply)
 Town Creek Elementary School (Winnabow)
 Union Elementary School (Shallotte)
 Virginia Williamson Elementary School (Bolivia)

Athletics
According to the North Carolina High School Athletic Association, for the 2018–2019 school year, North Brunswick, South Brunswick and West Brunswick are 3A schools in the Mideastern conference.

Brunswick County Early College has a small athletic team with The COAST does not have any athletic teams.

Awards
The Brunswick County Schools system has had four schools listed as Blue Ribbon Schools: Shallotte Middle School (1999–2000), Waccamaw School (2000–01), Brunswick College Early College High School (2017) and Union Elementary School (2019).

See also
List of school districts in North Carolina

References

External links
 

Education in Brunswick County, North Carolina
School districts in North Carolina